Ramón Vega (1 November 1939 – 6 September 2007) was a Puerto Rican sprinter. He competed in the men's 200 metres at the 1960 Summer Olympics.

References

1939 births
2007 deaths
Athletes (track and field) at the 1960 Summer Olympics
Olympic track and field athletes of Puerto Rico
People from Juana Díaz, Puerto Rico
Puerto Rican male sprinters
Place of birth missing
Pan American Games medalists in athletics (track and field)
Pan American Games bronze medalists for Puerto Rico
Athletes (track and field) at the 1959 Pan American Games
Medalists at the 1959 Pan American Games